Outapi wa Nakafingo na Temba, also Outapi or Uutapi and Ombalantu, is a town in northern Namibia near the border with Angola situated  northwest of Oshakati. It is the capital of Omusati region and the district capital of the Outapi electoral constituency. The language spoken there is Oshiwambo.

Economy and infrastructure
In 2001, Outapi was the smallest town in Namibia, with a population of just over 2,600. It is, however, developing rapidly. There is a large number of newly constructed government buildings and shops in the south of the town. The town features several schools, a community hall, a hospital and a police station. There are two open markets, one at the baobab tree and one at Onhimbu. There is also a tourist lodge.

Culture and tourism
Within the former South African Army base is the famous Omukwa Ombalantu baobab tree, a baobab whose huge hollow trunk has been used in the past as a post office, a chapel, and a coffee shop, and  houses a craft shop.

The town hosts the annual Olufuko Festival, which was initiated in 2012. The festival is a combination of a business expo and cultural celebrations, of which the initiation ceremony that prepares teenage girls for womanhood is the heart of the festival. Namibia's first president and founding father, Sam Nujoma, is the patron of the Olufuko Festival.

Politics

Outapi is governed by a town council that has seven seats. Omusati Region, to which Outapi belongs, is a stronghold of Namibia's ruling SWAPO party. For the 2015 local authority election no opposition party nominated a candidate, and SWAPO won all seven seats uncontested.

SWAPO also won the 2020 local authority election. It obtained 721 votes and gained five seats. The Independent Patriots for Change (IPC), an opposition party formed in August 2020, obtained 357 votes and gained the remaining two seats.

References

Towns in Namibia
Populated places in the Omusati Region